Mattheis  is a surname of:

 Andreas Mattheis (born 1954), Brazilian retired automobile racing driver
 Fiorella Mattheis (born 1988),  Brazilian actress, model, television presenter and entrepreneur
 Hilde Mattheis (born 1954), German politician
 Petra Mattheis (born 1967), German artist und photographer